Ralph Harvey Jackson (January 17, 1911June 25, 1966) was a Canadian professional ice hockey player. Jackson played 15 National Hockey League (NHL) seasons between 1929 and 1944 for the Toronto Maple Leafs, New York Americans, and Boston Bruins. He was a member of the Maple Leafs' famed Kid Line with Joe Primeau and Charlie Conacher, one of the early NHL's dominant scoring trios.  Jackson led the league in scoring in 1931–32 and was a member of Toronto's 1932 Stanley Cup championship team. He was named to five NHL All-Star teams and played in three benefit All-Star Games, including the Ace Bailey Benefit Game, the first All-Star contest in NHL history.

Off the ice, Jackson was well-known for his high-spending lifestyle and drinking habit that prompted his trade from Toronto to New York in 1939. He was remembered as one of hockey's tragic figures following his retirement, as he struggled with alcoholism and financial difficulty. In the 1960s, Jackson was a figure of controversy within the Hockey Hall of Fame selection committee, as the Hall used his lifestyle and personal problems to block his induction. He finally earned a place in the Hall of Fame in 1971, five years after his death. Jackson is also an honoured member of Canada's Sports Hall of Fame, which he was inducted into in 1975. He was the brother of fellow NHL player Art Jackson.

Playing career

Junior
Jackson grew up in Toronto, playing his youth hockey at "Poverty Pond" in the city's east side before playing at the Ravina Rink where he was discovered by Frank Selke, the assistant general manager of the Toronto Maple Leafs.  Selke signed Jackson to a contract and assigned him to the Toronto Marlboros in the Ontario Hockey Association (OHA)'s junior league for the 1927–28 season. Jackson scored four goals in four regular season games that season, and though the Marlboros were considered a favourite to win the Memorial Cup, the team was defeated in the Eastern final by the Ottawa Gunners. He returned to the team for the 1928–29 season, scoring 10 goals and 14 points in 9 regular season games. He then led the OHA playoffs with seven goals and nine points as the Marlboros won the OHA championship. Jackson was a leading offensive player for Toronto in the 1929 Memorial Cup playdowns, scoring 15 goals and 25 points in 13 games. The Marlboros reached the final, defeating the Elmwood Millionaires in a best-of-three series to win the franchise's first Memorial Cup championship.

Toronto Maple Leafs
Joining the Maple Leafs for the 1929–30 season, the 18-year-old Jackson was the youngest player in the National Hockey League (NHL). In his league debut against the Montreal Canadiens, Jackson knocked over his idol Howie Morenz with a bodycheck.  Assessing the youngster's potential following the hit, Morenz offered, "you'll do." Jackson appeared in 31 games for the Leafs, scoring 12 goals and adding 6 assists. He missed some time due to injury, during which he earned his nickname from the team's trainer, Tim Daly. According to Jackson: "Daly asked me to carry sticks for him. I told him I wasn't a stick boy, I was a hockey player. So he said I was nothing but a fresh busher [a term for someone who had just been called up from the minors] and the name stuck."

During his first season, Jackson was placed on a line with two other young players. Charlie Conacher, a teammate of his with the Marlboros, played right wing and Joe Primeau was their centre. The trio formed what became known as the "Kid Line," one of the early NHL's most famous scoring trios. Primeau was the line's playmaker, whose passes set up both Conacher and Jackson's goal-scoring ability.

Following a 31-point season in 1930–31, Jackson led the NHL in scoring with 53 points in 1931–32. At 21 years, 3 months old, he became the youngest scoring champion in NHL history, a record he would hold until 1980–81, when it was broken by Wayne Gretzky. Jackson's 28 goals that season was the most he would score in his career, and he was named to the NHL's First All-Star team for the first time of his career. He added five goals in the 1932 playoffs, including one of Toronto's six in the deciding game of the 1932 Stanley Cup Final, a 6–4 victory over the New York Rangers that clinched Toronto's first Stanley Cup championship since 1922.

The Kid Line remained Toronto's top offensive threat for several years; Jackson, Conacher and Primeau were the team's top three scorers for four consecutive seasons between 1932 and 1935. Following his league-leading season, Jackson led Toronto offensively in 1932–33 with 44 points. On November 20, 1934, Jackson set an NHL record when he became the first player in NHL history to score four goals in a period, notching four markers in the third period of a 5–2 victory over the St. Louis Eagles. The record has not been surpassed through 2019, though eleven players have matched it. He was named to three additional All-Star teams during this time, placed on the second team in 1932–33 and on the first team in both 1933–34 and 1934–35. Additionally, Jackson played in the Ace Bailey Benefit Game on February 14, 1934. Held in support of injured teammate Ace Bailey, it was the first all-star game in NHL history. Jackson scored two goals for the Maple Leafs in a 7–3 victory over the NHL All-Stars.

Following four consecutive 20-goal seasons, Jackson slipped to 11 goals in 1935–36.  The Kid Line was finally broken up. While they remained consistent offensive performers, they lacked defensive ability and opposing teams began to find success playing their own top scoring lines against the trio. Primeau subsequently retired in 1936 in favour of his business interests.  Despite the break-up, Jackson scored 21 goals and 40 points in 1936–37 to earn his fourth and final appearance on the first All-Star team.

Prior to the start of the 1937–38 season, Jackson played with the NHL All-Stars in the Howie Morenz Memorial Game, the NHL's second benefit all-star contest. In regular league play, his offence entered a decline as he scored 34 points that season, then 27 in 1938–39. 
Following the season, the Maple Leafs traded him to the New York Americans along with Jimmy Fowler, Murray Armstrong, Doc Romnes and Buzz Boll in exchange for Sweeney Schriner on May 18, 1939. The five-for-one deal was unprecedented in NHL history at that time.

New York and Boston
Prior to his first season in New York, Jackson played in his third benefit all-star game, the Babe Siebert Memorial Game, on October 29, 1939.  He represented the NHL All-Stars in a 5–2 victory over the Montreal Canadiens. In NHL play, he posted 12 goals and 20 points for the Americans, then improved to 26 points in 1940–41. He was unable to come to terms with team manager Red Dutton on a new contract for the 1941–42 season however, and did not join the team at the start of the season. The impasse lasted for half the season, until Dutton sold Jackson's rights to the Boston Bruins for $7,500 on January 4, 1942.

Joining the Bruins gave Jackson the opportunity to play alongside his younger brother Art. He played only 26 games that season due to his holdout, just over half of an NHL season of 48 games, scoring 12 points.  Though he played the left wing throughout his career, the Bruins switched him part-time to defence when they lost players to injury or the Second World War. He scored 34 points in 1942–43, and his 19 goals was Jackson's highest total in six seasons. The Bruins reached the 1943 Stanley Cup Final by defeating Montreal, but lost the series to the Detroit Red Wings in four straight games. Jackson's playoff overtime goal on March 25, 1943, at the Forum would turn out to be the last Boston playoff overtime goal in Montreal until 1992. Jackson played a final season in 1943–44, after which he announced his retirement as a player following a 15-year career.

Personal life
A handsome man with even features, Jackson lived the lifestyle of a Hollywood actor during his playing career, spending money freely, driving fast cars, and attending posh parties.  Maple Leafs' owner Conn Smythe unsuccessfully tried to convince Jackson to save his money for the future, even offering to match his player's savings dollar for dollar. Jackson's habits, particularly his drinking, ultimately played a role in his trade away from Toronto. Jackson's lifestyle came crashing down following his retirement as a player, as he no longer had the money to fund his pursuits. He unsuccessfully tried to overcome his alcoholism, lost two marriages to divorce, struggled to hold a job, and it was said that he could be found outside Maple Leaf Gardens trying to sell broken sticks of Maple Leaf players to try to make some money. He emerged as one of hockey's tragic figures.

Jackson suffered a series of injuries and ailments in his later years.  In 1958, he broke his neck after falling down a flight of stairs. His recovery took 18 months and cost him mobility in his right hand.  Two months after his release, Jackson returned to hospital with a bout of jaundice. He was hospitalized again in 1962 following an epileptic seizure.

As Jackson's health failed, he became the focus of a controversy within the Hockey Hall of Fame selection committee. Though he was considered one of hockey's greatest left wingers and was famed for his attacking style of play and backhand shot, Jackson's personal problems led Hall chairman Conn Smythe to blacklist him from entry.  Though Primeau and Conacher had gained induction, Jackson died on June 25, 1966, without being given the same honour. It would be another five years until the remainder of the selection committee finally overruled Smythe and posthumously inducted Jackson into the Hall of Fame in 1971.  Smythe quit the committee in protest, while Jackson's son Kim accepted the honour on his father's behalf. In 1975, Jackson was inducted into Canada's Sports Hall of Fame, and The Hockey News ranked him 55th in its 1997 book, The Top 100 NHL players of All-Time.

Career statistics

* Stanley Cup Champion.

References
Career statistics:

External links

1911 births
1966 deaths
Boston Bruins players
Canadian ice hockey left wingers
Hockey Hall of Fame inductees
Ice hockey people from Toronto
National Hockey League scoring leaders (prior to 1947–48)
New York Americans players
Stanley Cup champions
Toronto Maple Leafs players
Toronto Marlboros players
Canadian expatriate ice hockey players in the United States